Public Personnel Management is a quarterly peer-reviewed academic journal covering all aspects of human resources and public administration. It was established in 1972 as Personnel Administration and Public Personnel Review, which was created from the merger of Personnel Administration and Public Personnel Review. It obtained its current name in 1973.  It was founded by the International Public Management Association for Human Resources, and is published by SAGE Publications. The editor-in-chief is Heather Getha-Taylor (University of Kansas). According to the Journal Citation Reports, the journal has a 2017 impact factor of 1.364, ranking it 28 out of 47 journals in the category "Public Administration".

References

External links

Human resource management journals
Publications established in 1972
Quarterly journals
SAGE Publishing academic journals
English-language journals
Academic journals associated with international learned and professional societies